Shirdi Lok Sabha constituency is one of the 48 Lok Sabha (lower house of Indian parliament) constituencies of Maharashtra state in western India. This constituency was created on 19 February 2008 as a part of the implementation of the Presidential notification based on the recommendations of the Delimitation Commission of India constituted on 12 July 2002. This constituency is one of the two Lok Sabha constituencies in Ahmednagar district. It first held elections in 2009 and its first member of parliament (MP) was Bhausaheb Rajaram Wakchaure of Shiv Sena. As of the 2014 elections, its current MP is Sadashiv Lokhande also of Shiv Sena.

Assembly segments
Presently, Shirdi Lok Sabha constituency comprises six Vidhan Sabha (legislative assembly) segments. These segments are:

Members of Parliament 

1952-2008: Constituency does not exist

See Kopargaon Lok Sabha constituency

Election results

General elections 2019

General election 2014

General election 2009

See also
 Kopargaon Lok Sabha constituency
 Ahmednagar district
 List of Constituencies of the Lok Sabha

Notes

External links
Shirdi lok sabha  constituency election 2019 results details

Lok Sabha constituencies in Maharashtra
Lok Sabha constituencies in Maharashtra created in 2008
Shirdi
Ahmednagar district